The Van Gelder Studio is a recording studio at 445 Sylvan Avenue, Englewood Cliffs, New Jersey, United States. Following the use of his parents' home at 25 Prospect Avenue, Hackensack, New Jersey, for the original studio, Rudy Van Gelder (1924–2016) moved to the new location for his recording studio in July 1959. It has been used to record many albums released by jazz labels such as Blue Note, Prestige, Impulse!, Verve and CTI. It was added to the National Register of Historic Places on April 25, 2022, for its significance in performing arts and engineering.

Background
From around 1952, beginning with a session led by Gil Melle that was sold to Blue Note, recordings were made by Van Gelder for commercial release in the living room of his parents' house at 25 Prospect Avenue in Hackensack, a house that had been built with the intention of doubling as a recording studio (the area was later subsumed by the Hackensack University Medical Center). In July 1959, Van Gelder moved to a new facility in Englewood Cliffs. The last recording session at Hackensack and the first at Englewood Cliffs were both led by Ike Quebec and are contained in From Hackensack to Englewood Cliffs, a collection of singles recorded by the saxophonist in July 1959.

Important recordings made at Hackensack include Miles Davis' Workin' and Steamin' (1956); solo debuts by Hank Mobley (Hank Mobley Quartet, 1955) and Johnny Griffin (Introducing Johnny Griffin, 1956).

Van Gelder's recording techniques were closely guarded, to the extent that microphones were moved when photography of bands was taking place in order to disguise his means of recording.

The new structure with a 39-foot ceiling and fine acoustics, designed by the architect David Henken and inspired by the work of Frank Lloyd Wright, resembles a chapel. The critic Ira Gitler describes the studio in liner notes for the saxophonist Booker Ervin's The Space Book (1964): "In the high-domed, wooden-beamed, brick-tiled, spare modernity of Rudy Van Gelder's studio, one can get a feeling akin to religion." "When I started making records, there was no quality recording equipment available to me," Van Gelder recalled in 2005. "I had to build my own mixer. The only people who had quality equipment were the big companies. They were building their own electronics."

Among many significant recordings made at Englewood Cliffs are John Coltrane's A Love Supreme (1964), Sonny Rollins' Sonny Rollins on Impulse! (1965), Stanley Turrentine's Cherry (1972) and Don't Mess with Mister T (1973), Andrew Hill's Point of Departure (1964), Freddie Hubbard's Red Clay (1970) and Hank Mobley's Soul Station (1960).

List of recording sessions
The following table lists recording sessions for albums held at the studio.

1950s

1960s

1970s

1980s

1990s

2000s

See also
List of US recording studios
National Register of Historic Places listings in Bergen County, New Jersey

References

Companies based in Bergen County, New Jersey
Recording studios in the United States
Mass media in New Jersey
 
1959 establishments in New Jersey
Englewood Cliffs, New Jersey
National Register of Historic Places in Bergen County, New Jersey
New Jersey Register of Historic Places